Another Language is a 1933 American Pre-Code romantic drama film directed by Edward H. Griffith and starring Robert Montgomery and Helen Hayes.

Plot
A newlywed discovers that she and her husband's snobby family speak different languages: Stella and Victor meet in Europe, fall deeply in love, and marry soon thereafter. They sail back to the States to meet Victor's family, and the honeymoon is over: Stella is free spirited and Victor, although traditional in nature, does not interfere in his wife's pursuits outside the home.  Victor's family, dominated by his manipulative mother, and they find Stella, pretentious and aloof. Their marriage starts to fall apart when Victor begins siding with his family instead of his wife.  A frustrated Stella finds a sympathetic ear in Victor's nephew, Jerry.

Cast
 Robert Montgomery as Victor Hallam
 Helen Hayes as Stella Hallam
 Louise Closser Hale as Mother Hallam
 John Beal as Jerry Hallam
 Henry Travers as Pop Hallam
 Margaret Hamilton as Helen Hallam
 Willard Robertson as Harry Hallam
 Minor Watson as Paul Hallam
 Hal K. Dawson as Walter Hallam
 Irene Cattell as Grace Hallam
 Maidel Turner as Etta Hallam
 William Farnum as C. Forrester

References

External links
Another Language at TCMDB
Another Language at IMDb
1953 Best Plays radio adaptation of original play at Internet Archive

1933 films
1933 romantic drama films
American black-and-white films
American romantic drama films
American films based on plays
Films directed by Edward H. Griffith
Films produced by Walter Wanger
Metro-Goldwyn-Mayer films
Films with screenplays by Herman J. Mankiewicz
Films with screenplays by Donald Ogden Stewart
1930s English-language films
1930s American films